The Stattkus-Verzeichnis (SV) is a catalogue of the musical compositions of the Italian composer Claudio Monteverdi. The catalogue was published in 1985 by Manfred H. Stattkus (Claudio Monteverdi: Verzeichnis der erhaltenen Werke). A free, basic second edition of the catalogue is available online.

Manfred H. Stattkus died in August 2012.

List 

Click the links to go to the corresponding section in the table.

References 

Classical music catalogues